Chien-Peng Yuan is a Taiwanese physicist.

Yuan graduated from National Taiwan University and pursued doctoral study at the University of Michigan. He began teaching at Michigan State University in 1992, was appointed to a full professorship in 2004, and subsequently assumed the Wu-Ki Tung Endowed Professorship in Particle Physics in October 2017. In 2013, the American Physical Society elevated Yuan to fellow status, acknowledging him "[f]or original contributions to the theory of single top-quark production, the development of QCD resummation techniques, the global analysis of parton distribution functions, and their application to hadron collider physics."

References

Living people
20th-century Taiwanese physicists
21st-century Taiwanese physicists
Year of birth missing (living people)
Taiwanese expatriates in the United States
Fellows of the American Physical Society
University of Michigan alumni
Michigan State University faculty
National Taiwan University alumni